Toril Hallan is a Norwegian ski-orienteering competitor. 

She won a bronze medal in the relay event at the 1982 World Ski Orienteering Championships in Austria, together with Ranveig Narbuvold and Sidsel Owren. At the 1986 World Championships in Bulgaria she won the gold medal in the relay, together with Ragnhild Bratberg and Ellen Sofie Olsvik. In Finland in 1988 she won a silver medal, together with Anne Svingheim and Ragnhild Bratberg.

References

Year of birth missing (living people)
Living people
Norwegian orienteers
Female orienteers
Ski-orienteers
20th-century Norwegian women